Marcela Vieyra Alamilla (26 December 1963 – 2 March 2019) was a Mexican politician from the Institutional Revolutionary Party. From 2011 to 2012, she served as Deputy of the LXI Legislature of the Mexican Congress representing Hidalgo.

References

1963 births
2019 deaths
Politicians from Hidalgo (state)
Women members of the Chamber of Deputies (Mexico)
Institutional Revolutionary Party politicians
21st-century Mexican politicians
21st-century Mexican women politicians
Deputies of the LXI Legislature of Mexico
Members of the Chamber of Deputies (Mexico) for Hidalgo (state)